Walter Fredersdorf (20 February 1896 – 29 September 1965) was a German film editor. Fredersdorf worked as editor on more than forty films, and also as assistant director on another five.

Selected filmography
 Black Roses (1935)
 Winter in the Woods (1936)
 A Wedding Dream (1936)
 Truxa (1937)
 The Divine Jetta (1937)
 Faded Melody (1938)
 Anna Favetti (1938)
 The Blue Fox (1938)
 The Governor (1939)
 A Woman Like You (1939)
 Who's Kissing Madeleine? (1939)
 Enemies (1940)
 Quax the Crash Pilot (1941)
 Ghost in the Castle (1947)
 Paths in Twilight (1948)
 Abundance of Life (1950)
 Furioso (1950)
 Eyes of Love (1951)
 Carnival in White (1952)
 The Chaplain of San Lorenzo (1953)
 Everything for Father (1953)
 Spring Song (1954)
 Island of the Dead (1955)

References

Bibliography
 Giesen, Rolf. Nazi Propaganda Films: A History and Filmography. McFarland & Company, 2003.

External links

1896 births
1965 deaths
Mass media people from Magdeburg
German film editors
Film people from Saxony-Anhalt